HMS Daring was a 12 gun-brig of the Royal Navy which became part of the Experimental Squadrons of both 1844 and 1845, and later served in the West Indies. She was sold in 1864.

Construction
Daring was designed by Mr. Thomas White of Cowes and built in Portsmouth Dockyard. She was launched on 2 April 1844 and commissioned on 22 October the same year.

History

The Experimental Squadron of 1844
From September 1844 until February 1847, she was commanded by Commander Henry James Matson, an outspoken abolitionist and hero of the Preventative Squadron. She was employed on the Home Station, where she formed part of the 1844 Experimental Brig Squadron. The Times stated:

She appeared to be a good sailer; the report of the comparative sailing qualities of the vessels making up the Experimental Brig Squadron reads:

The Experimental Squadron of 1845
Daring joined the two-deckers Albion, Vanguard, Superb, Rodney and Canopus on the third cruise of the 1845 Experimental Squadron, the only brig to do so. They were joined on 21 October by the wooden steam sloop HMS Rattler.  The Times reported that Daring could often not keep up with the larger ships: Service on the North America and West Indies Station
From 1846 Daring served on the North America and West Indies Station. On 10 June 1846 she captured the Spanish slave schooners Rauret and Numa off Guano Point. The Mixed Court of Justice at the Havana found in favour of the owners and sentenced the ships to be restored to their masters on 15 July 1846.

The Wreck of USS Somers
The United States government awarded medals to thirty-nine officers and crew of Daring, Endymion and Alarm in recognition of saving several officers and crew of the United States brig Somers in the harbour of Vera Cruz on 10 December 1846.Daring apparently served the rest of her career on the North America and West Indies Station, returning to Britain at the end of each commission. Commander William Peel (a later winner of the VC and 3rd son of Sir Robert Peel, British Prime Minister) became her captain from February 1847 until October 1848. She refitted at Chatham in 1850 and from August 1852 was commanded by Commander Gerard John Napier. A memorial Inscription in the Port Royal Parish Church records that Lieutenant Smith, Midshipman Trevillian and 5 seamen of Daring'' were "drowned on June 23rd, 1853,- by the upsetting of one of her boats, - in the crossing of Tampico." She visited the Turks and Caicos Islands in 1855, and is recorded on a 20c stamp issued by the islands in August 1973.

Disposal
She was sold out of the service to Castle and Beech on 7 October 1864 and broken up at Charlton in March 1865. Her figurehead, a contemporary sailor staring straight ahead, is on display at the National Maritime Museum, Greenwich.

Commanding officers

Notes

References

External links
 

Brigs of the Royal Navy
Ships built in Portsmouth
1844 ships